Mopani can be:
 Colophospermum mopane, a tree species found in South Africa, Zimbabwe, Mozambique, Botswana, Zambia, Namibia, Angola and Malawi
 Gonimbrasia belina, an emperor moth caterpillar that lives in the mopani (mopane) tree 
 Mopani District Municipality, South Africa
 Mopani Copper Mine, a copper mining company